Cameron Mark Thomas Brannagan (born 9 May 1996) is an English professional footballer who plays as a midfielder for League One club Oxford United.

An academy graduate of Liverpool, Brannagan made his senior debut in 2015 but managed just nine appearances for the club. He joined Fleetwood Town on loan in 2017 before signing for Oxford United on a permanent deal the following year.

Club career

Liverpool
Born in Manchester, Brannagan was raised in Salford. Despite growing up supporting Manchester United, as did his family, he joined Liverpool as a child, having previously been at Manchester City and Manchester United's academies.
 
Despite a rough start for the under-18 side because of injury, at the start of the 2012–13 season he became a regular for the under-21s and scored three goals in the U21 Premier League campaign in 2013–14. During this period Brannagan was reportedly extensively scouted by Barcelona. His impressive performances for the under-21s caught the eye of first-team manager Brendan Rodgers, who named Brannagan among the substitutes for Liverpool's FA Cup third-round tie against Oldham Athletic on 5 January 2014. He was handed number 50, but did not get onto the pitch as the Reds won 2–0.

Over the next two seasons, Brannagan continued to feature for Liverpool's reserves in the under-21 Premier League. In the UEFA Youth League, he scored twice in five appearances against Real Madrid. In the last 16 of the UEFA Youth League against Benfica, Brannagan captained the reserve side for the first time, as they lost 2–1. He then appeared as an unused substitute in the last 32 of the UEFA Europa League against Beşiktaş, as Liverpool lost in a penalty shootout on 26 February 2015. Towards the end of the 2014–15 season, Brannagan appeared four more times as an unused substitute for the first team.

In the 2015–16 season, Brannagan featured in the reserve side for the most of the season. While still playing for the reserve side, on 17 September 2015, he made his senior Reds debut in their opening UEFA Europa League group stage fixture against Bordeaux, replacing fellow youngster Jordan Rossiter after 76 minutes. On 26 October, Brannagan signed a new contract to keep him at the club until 2018. The following day new Liverpool manager Jürgen Klopp described Brannagan as a real talent who has "everything you need" from a midfield player. On 28 October 2015, Brannagan made his first start for Liverpool in a 1–0 win over Bournemouth in the fourth round of the League Cup. At the beginning of 2016, Brannagan featured in two further FA Cup ties, against Exeter City and West Ham United. Towards the end of the 2015–16 season, Brannagan made his Premier League debut, coming on as a second-half substitute in a 3–1 loss against Swansea City on 1 May 2016. Two weeks later, on 15 May 2016, he made his first Premier League start, in the last game of the season, a 1–1 draw against West Bromwich Albion. By the end of the 2015–16 season, Brannagan had made a total of nine first-team appearances in all competitions.

Ahead of the 2016–17 Premier League season, Brannagan's number changed from number 32 to 25. Although he took part in the club's pre-season tour, he made no appearances in Liverpool's first team throughout the season. While fighting for first-team opportunities, he continued to play for the reserve side before his departure in January, scoring twice in a 6–2 win over Tottenham Hotspur Reserves.

In May 2016, it was reported that Brannagan was in a contract negotiations with Liverpool over a new deal. However, the contract negotiations resulted in a disagreement between the parties over his pathway to the first team over the summer of 2017 and he was dropped from the club's pre-season tour as a result. Brannagan spent the first half of the season in the reserve team, despite suffering a broken hand. In the last two remaining matches for the club's reserves, Brannagan scored two goals in two matches, against Sunderland U23 and Swansea City U23.

Loan to Fleetwood Town
On 5 July 2016, Liverpool rejected an offer in excess of £1,000,000 for Brannagan from newly promoted Championship side Wigan Athletic. After this, Brannagan expected to leave Liverpool on loan to gain first-team experience, as Wigan Athletic, having had their transfer bid rejected, tried to sign him on loan instead, but it fell through. On 27 January 2017, after injuries starved Brannagan of first-team action at Liverpool, he was loaned out to League One side Fleetwood Town for the remainder of the season.

Brannagan made his Fleetwood Town debut, coming on as a second-half substitute, in a 1–1 draw against Charlton Athletic on 4 February 2017. He was praised after his debut for his "creativity and quality" by manager Uwe Rösler. Manager Rösler placed him "in a number 10 role up front with Devante Cole", though he appeared on the substitute bench. He played a role in a 1–0 win over Walsall on 14 March 2017 when he set up Cian Bolger to score the only goal of the game. Brannagan also appeared once in the play-offs, in a 0–0 draw against Bradford City, a game that saw Fleetwood Town eliminated on aggregate after defeat in the first leg.

At the end of the 2016–17 season, having made 14 appearances in all competitions, he returned to his parent club.

Oxford United
Brannagan signed for League One side Oxford United on a 3-year deal for an undisclosed fee on 11 January 2018, the move ending his 16-year association with Liverpool. However, his Oxford United career suffered an early setback when he injured his ankle. He made his debut in a 2–1 league defeat away at AFC Wimbledon on 10 March 2018. The following season, on 29 September 2018 and against the same opponents, Brannagan scored his first goal for Oxford, though the result was another 2–1 victory for Wimbledon. He won the Players' Player of the Year Award for the 2018–19 season.

On 29 January 2022, Brannagan scored a first career hat-trick in a 7–2 away defeat of Gillingham, scoring all four of his goals from the penalty spot, becoming the first player in the league's 138-year history to score four penalties in a match. At the end of the 2021–22 season he won both the supporters' and players' Player of the Year awards.

On the morning of 28 July 2022, it was reported that Blackpool had triggered Brannagan's release clause and that he was travelling up to the North-West to sign for the Championship club. Despite seemingly being set to sign, Brannagan signed a new three-year contract with Oxford that evening.

International career
Brannagan has represented England at under-18 level. He earned two caps for the U18s in March 2014, both against Croatia.

A year later in August 2015, Brannagan was called up to the England U20 squad. He earned two caps for the U20s in September 2014, both against Czech Republic U20.

Career statistics

Honours
Individual
PFA Team of the Year: 2019–20 League One, 2021–22 League One

References

External links

Profile at the Oxford United F.C. website
FA Profile

1996 births
Living people
Footballers from Manchester
English footballers
England youth international footballers
Association football midfielders
Liverpool F.C. players
Oxford United F.C. players
Premier League players
Fleetwood Town F.C. players
English Football League players